The following is a list of notable events and releases that happened in 2004 in music in South Korea.

Debuting and disbanded in 2004

Debuting groups

M. Street
Rumble Fish
SG Wannabe
The TRAX
V.O.S
WA★DISH
Wanted

Solo debuts

Chungja
Illson
Jang Yoon-jeong
Kebee
MayBee
Outsider
Paloalto
Song Seung-heon
Lee Seung-gi
Taebin
Tei
Tony Ahn
Younha

Reformed groups
N.EX.T
R.ef

Disbanded groups
Isak N Jiyeon
K'Pop
R.ef

Releases in 2004

January

February

March

April

May

June

July

August

September

October

November

December

See also
2004 in South Korea
List of South Korean films of 2004

References

 
South Korean music
K-pop